Craig Thomas Buckham (born 9 August 1983) is an English former first-class cricketer.

Buckham was born at Ashford in December 1983. While attending Anglia Ruskin University, Buckham made three appearances in first-class cricket for Cambridge UCCE from 2004–06, playing against Essex, Warwickshire and Kent. A leg break bowler, Buckham bowled a total of 30 overs without taking a wicket, while conceding 187 runs. In addition to playing first-class cricket, Buckham also played at minor counties level. He made two appearances for the Kent Cricket Board in the 2002 MCCA Knockout Trophy, later making seven appearances for Cambridgeshire in the Minor Counties Championship between 2007–2009.

References

External links

1983 births
Living people
People from Ashford, Kent
Alumni of Anglia Ruskin University
English cricketers
Kent Cricket Board cricketers
Cambridge MCCU cricketers
Cambridgeshire cricketers